António Alberto Bastos Pimparel (born 1 May 1982), known as Beto, is a Portuguese professional footballer who plays as a goalkeeper.

He made a name for himself at Leixões before transferring to Porto in 2009, being a backup during his spell. After one season in Romania with CFR Cluj he joined Sevilla in January 2013, going on appear in 89 competitive matches and win two Europa League trophies. He also spent three years in the Turkish Süper Lig with Göztepe, after signing in 2017.

Beto earned 16 caps for Portugal, being part of the squads in three World Cups and Euro 2012.

Club career

Sporting CP and Leixões

Beto was born in Loures, Grande Lisboa. After unsuccessfully developing in local Sporting CP's youth system, he played one season on loan to neighbours Casa Pia AC, being released in June 2004.

After one year each with G.D. Chaves and F.C. Marco, both in the second division, Beto joined Leixões S.C. for the 2006–07 campaign, helping the Matosinhos club return to the Primeira Liga and only missing a total of seven matches in his three seasons.

Porto
In March 2009, before 2008–09 ended, Beto agreed to a move to FC Porto, in a four-year deal worth €750.000 effective as of June. During his two-season spell he acted almost exclusively as backup to Brazilian Helton, being mostly restricted to Taça de Portugal appearances; on 22 May 2011, with the score at 2–2, he stopped a penalty kick in the domestic cup final, with his team eventually winning 6–2 in the Portuguese capital.

Braga and Sevilla
For 2011–12, Beto was loaned to Romanian side CFR Cluj, only missing seven Liga I games during the season for the eventual champions. Released by Porto he returned to his country in the following summer, signing for two years with S.C. Braga; however, late into the following transfer window, he moved to Sevilla FC as the Spaniards were looking to strengthen the position following the departure of Diego López to Real Madrid – the loan was arranged until June, with the possibility of a permanent transfer afterwards.

Profiting from injury to Andrés Palop, Beto made his debut with the Andalusians one day after arriving, starting in a 2–1 away loss against Atlético Madrid in the first leg of the semi-finals of the Copa del Rey, with his team playing the last eight minutes with only nine players. His first La Liga match came on 3 February 2013, in a 2–1 home win over Rayo Vallecano.

Beto was subsequently signed on a permanent basis, being first choice for head coach Unai Emery. He contributed 43 appearances in all competitions in the 2013–14 campaign, including ten in the team's victorious run in the UEFA Europa League, where he saved two penalties from Óscar Cardozo and Rodrigo in the final's shootout against S.L. Benfica.

Beto spent several months of 2014–15 on the sidelines, due to injury: first, a shoulder dislocation after a collision with Real Madrid's Karim Benzema, followed by an ailment to his left leg. After finishing the season as backup to Sergio Rico, he was reinstated by Emery for the 2015 UEFA Super Cup, performing well overall but conceding five goals in the 4–5 loss to FC Barcelona.

Following the emergence of David Soria also from the club's youth system, Beto was demoted to third-choice.

Return to Sporting
On 6 August 2016, free agent Beto signed a two-year contract with former team Sporting. He made his debut in competitive games for his first club on 13 October 2016, at the age of 34 years and five months, keeping a clean sheet in a 1–0 away win against F.C. Famalicão in the Portuguese Cup; he dedicated the performance to his late father.

Göztepe
On 29 July 2017, shortly after having expressed a desire to leave Sporting in order to have a better chance of 2018 FIFA World Cup selection, Beto joined Göztepe S.K. from Turkey for an undisclosed fee. After 95 official games, he left at the end of his contract in August 2020.

Later years
Beto returned to Leixões on 21 September 2020. He terminated his contract the following 15 March at his own request, returning to the top tier the next day on a short-term deal at S.C. Farense to cover for seriously injured Rafael Defendi.

In February 2022, aged 39, Beto joined Veikkausliiga side HIFK Fotboll on a one-year contract. He won three consecutive penalty shootouts in the Finnish Cup, helping them to reach the semi-finals. On 4 July, he was sent off in added time of a 0–1 home defeat against Ilves for fighting with Kalle Katz, and later that month he was released by mutual consent.

International career
Beto made his debut for Portugal on 10 June 2009, in a 0–0 friendly match in Estonia. After finishing 2009–10 in Porto's starting 11, he was named by manager Carlos Queiroz in a provisional 24-player list for the 2010 FIFA World Cup, making the final cut for the finals in South Africa where he did not leave the substitutes' bench. He was also an unused part of the squad at UEFA Euro 2012.

Beto was also selected four years later for the tournament in Brazil, making his debut in the competition on 22 June against the United States in the second group stage match, after starter Rui Patrício was injured in the first encounter against Germany. He was named in the provisional 24-man squad for the 2017 FIFA Confederations Cup, being also picked for the following year's World Cup.

On 14 October 2018, the 36-year-old Beto captained Portugal for the first time in a 3–1 friendly win away to Scotland.

Career statistics

Club

International

Honours
Sporting CP
Taça de Portugal: 2001–02

Leixões
Segunda Liga: 2006–07

Porto
Primeira Liga: 2010–11
Taça de Portugal: 2009–10, 2010–11
Supertaça Cândido de Oliveira: 2010
UEFA Europa League: 2010–11

CFR Cluj
Liga I: 2011–12

Sevilla
UEFA Europa League: 2013–14, 2014–15

Portugal B
Torneio Vale do Tejo: 2004

Portugal
UEFA Nations League: 2018–19
FIFA Confederations Cup third place: 2017

References

External links

Leixões official profile 

1982 births
Living people
People from Loures
Sportspeople from Lisbon District
Portuguese footballers
Association football goalkeepers
Primeira Liga players
Liga Portugal 2 players
Segunda Divisão players
Sporting CP B players
Sporting CP footballers
Casa Pia A.C. players
G.D. Chaves players
F.C. Marco players
Leixões S.C. players
FC Porto players
S.C. Braga players
S.C. Farense players
Liga I players
CFR Cluj players
La Liga players
Sevilla FC players
Süper Lig players
Göztepe S.K. footballers
Veikkausliiga players
HIFK Fotboll players
UEFA Europa League winning players
Portugal youth international footballers
Portugal under-21 international footballers
Portugal B international footballers
Portugal international footballers
2010 FIFA World Cup players
UEFA Euro 2012 players
2014 FIFA World Cup players
2017 FIFA Confederations Cup players
2018 FIFA World Cup players
UEFA Nations League-winning players
Portuguese expatriate footballers
Expatriate footballers in Romania
Expatriate footballers in Spain
Expatriate footballers in Turkey
Expatriate footballers in Finland
Portuguese expatriate sportspeople in Romania
Portuguese expatriate sportspeople in Spain
Portuguese expatriate sportspeople in Turkey
Portuguese expatriate sportspeople in Finland